Ethel Portnoy (March 8, 1927 – May 25, 2004) was a Dutch writer of prose, who wrote essays, columns, short stories, travel stories and several novels.

Biography 
Ethel Portnoy was born in Philadelphia but grew up in the Bronx in New York City as the daughter of Russian-Jewish immigrants. She took classes in English literature in New York City and learned French in the United States, then departed to Europe in 1950 with a Fulbright for the University of Lyon. She also studied cultural anthropology and archeology in Paris, with Claude Lévi-Strauss amongst others. She married Dutch author Rudy Kousbroek (1929–2010) in 1951. She raised two children and until 1962 she worked at the UNESCO. She worked for Dutch papers and was published in Randstad, in the weeklies Haagse Post and Vrij Nederland and also in the NRC Handelsblad. The family moved to The Hague in 1970. In 1978 Portnoy and Hannemieke Stamperius founded the feminist literary journal Chrysallis. Since 1979, she worked at the journal Maatstaf.

Portnoy debuted as a novelist in 1971 at the age of 44 with the book Steen en Been. She wrote in English, but considered herself a Dutch writer. Her books were translated by her (ex-)husband (they were divorced in the 1980s), their daughter Hepzibah Kousbroek (1954–2009) and by Tinke Davids.

Works 
Most of her books were published by Amsterdam publisher Meulenhoff.
 1971 - Steen en been en andere verhalen. Meulenhoff.
 1974 - De brandende bruid. Meulenhoff
 1978 - Broodje Aap. De folklore van de post-industriële samenleving. De Harmonie, Amsterdam (urban legends)
 1978 - Belle van Zuylen ontmoet Cagliostro: Een toneelstuk in twee bedrijven. Meulenhoff
 1981 - Het ontwaken van de zee. Meulenhoff
 1983 - Vliegende vellen: Schetsen en verhalen. Meulenhoff
 1984 - Amourettes en andere verhalen. Knippenberg
 1984 - Vluchten: Reisverhalen. Meulenhoff
 1985 - Een hondeleven. Arbeiderspers, Amsterdam
 1986 - De geklede mens. Cantecleer
 1986 - De lifter en andere verhalen. Anthos
 1987 - Dromomania. Stiefkinderen van de cultuur: Essays. Meulenhoff
 1989 - Opstandige vrouwen. Meulenhoff
 1990 - Rook over Rusland: Reisverhaal. Meulenhoff
 1991 - De eerste zoen. Meulenhoff.
 1992 - Europese kusten: Fotografische impressies. Martin Kers, photography. Inmerc
 1992 - Gemengde gevoelens. Meulenhoff
 1992 - Madonna's appel: Over vrouwen en de media. Meulenhoff
 1992 - Broodje aap met: Een verdere bijdrage tot de folklore van de post-industriele samanleving. Harmonie.
 1993 - Altijd zomer. Meulenhoff
 1994 - Overal thuis: Reisverhalen. Meulenhoff
 1996 - Bange mensen: Een Haagse vertelling. Meulenhoff
 1998 - Genietingen: Essays.Meulenhoff
 2000 - Zielespijs en wat verder ter tafel komt: Essays. Meulenhoff
 2003 - Portret. Meulenhoff (memoirs)
 2004 - Parijse feesten. Meulenhoff
 2004 - Vijf onbekende zaken van Sherlock Holmes. De Harmonie

Trivia 
The Dutch language is using the term "Broodje Aap" ('monkey sandwich') to refer to urban legends as a result of Portnoy's book with the same title.

Literature 
 Doeschka Meijsing: Ethel Portnoy: Informatie. Meulenhoff, Amsterdam 1984
 Lydia Lippens: Ethel Portnoy: Een bibliografie. Lippens, 1986

References

External links 
 Entry on Portnoy by Dutch art historian Gary Schwartz

Dutch women writers
Dutch Jews
American emigrants to the Netherlands
Writers from Philadelphia
1927 births
2004 deaths